Violence and peace in Islam could refer to:
Islam and violence
Peace in Islamic philosophy
Religion of Peace
Jihad (warfare)